Aleksandrs Glazovs (born 30 April 1970) is a former football midfielder from Latvia. He obtained a total number of 15 caps for the Latvia national team between 1992 and 1994, scoring no goal. His last club was Policija Riga, where he retired in 1999.

Honours
 Baltic Cup
 1993

References
 

1970 births
Living people
Latvian footballers
Association football midfielders
Latvia international footballers